Larisa Valentinovna Krivtsova (born January 1, 1949, Lithuanian Soviet Socialist Republic) is a Soviet and Russian journalist, producer, director, media manager, and former TV presenter (1991-2004).

Biography 
In 1974 she graduated from the Yaroslavl State Pedagogical Institute in the specialty  Russian language and literature.  In the same year he was admitted to the Yaroslavl Theater School at the acting department.

In journalism since 1980 (director of Yaroslavl Television Studio).

In 1986, he graduated from the journalism faculty of Moscow Higher Party School. In 1987 - the correspondent of the Moscow edition of Soviet Central Television.

From December 1997, before 2003, she was a permanent host of the program Good Morning  on Thursday on the Channel One Russia.

Since 2008, Director of the morning program Channel One. Creator and a source of inspiration software Let Them Talk, Malakhov+, Fashion Sentence,  City of Women,   Big Lunch.

The author of a cycle of journalistic works Of contemporary life Mowgli, devoted to the problems of children's homes.

Personal life 
Krivtsova is married. Her son, Yevgeny, is a journalist and broadcaster.

References

External links 
 Интервью «Эху Москвы»
 Интервью сайту Business Lady
 В Профессиональном клубе секретами мастерства со студентами делилась Лариса Кривцова

1949 births
Living people
Russian television presenters
Russian newspaper publishers (people)
Russian journalists
Russian women journalists
Soviet television presenters
Television executives
Women television executives
Soviet journalists
Russian women television presenters